Wade Davis may refer to:

 Wade Davis (anthropologist) (born 1953), Canadian anthropologist and ethnobotanist
 Wade Davis (American football) (born 1977), former American football player
 Wade Davis (baseball) (born 1985), former baseball player
 Wade–Davis Bill, American legislation, vetoed by President Abraham Lincoln in 1864
 Wade Davis (CEO) Univision